Gienir Eduardo García Figueroa (born 8 October 1989) in Zacatepec, Morelos, is a Mexican footballer.

Club career
García began his career in the youth ranks of top Mexican club Cruz Azul. He made his first division debut on 3 July 2010, during the 2010–11 season. He also played for Cruz Azul Hidalgo in Mexico's Liga de Ascenso. Garcia played 2 matches in the 2010–11 CONCACAF Champions League with Cruz Azul and scored one goal versus San Francisco from Panama.

García entered the Major League Soccer draft in January 2012 and was chosen second overall in the 2012 MLS Supplemental Draft by Vancouver Whitecaps FC. Days later he was traded to Montreal Impact in exchange for the rights to Etienne Barbara.

On 25 May 2012, the Impact placed García on MLS waivers. he then returned to play for Cruz Azul Hidalgo for the 2012–13 season. The following season, García joined Ascenso MX side Ballenas Galeana.

Personal
García is the son of former footballer, Gustavo, and brother of footballers Gustavo Enrique and Giovanni.

See also
List of people from Morelos, Mexico

References

External links
 

1989 births
Living people
Association football defenders
Cruz Azul footballers
Cruz Azul Hidalgo footballers
Ballenas Galeana Morelos footballers
CF Montréal players
Vancouver Whitecaps FC draft picks
Liga MX players
Ascenso MX players
Liga Premier de México players
Mexican expatriate footballers
Expatriate soccer players in Canada
Mexican expatriate sportspeople in Canada
Footballers from Morelos
Mexican footballers